Yeon Jung-Ki (Hangul: 연정기) is a South Korean archer who won the 2001 World Archery Championships in Beijing.

See also
Korean archery
Archery
List of South Korean archers

References

South Korean male archers
World Archery Championships medalists
20th-century South Korean people
21st-century South Korean people